Senator Shipley may refer to:

Frank E. Shipley (1891–1971), Maryland State Senate
Tom Shipley (politician) (born 1953), Iowa State Senate